Aalikam Tangii is an uninhabited island located in the Bering Sea, it is located in the Aleutians West Census Area.

References

Uninhabited islands of Alaska
Islands of Unorganized Borough, Alaska
Islands of Alaska